Hua Qianfang (born 1978) is a Chinese essayist and blogger. He is now the vice president of Fushun Writers Association. His most well-known works are Our Armageddon and Our Journey Is The Ocean of Stars. He is a supporter of communist orthodoxy and has expressed nationalist, anti-American and anti-western sentiments. He is noted for praising Xi Jinping, General Secretary of the Communist Party of China at a conference on art and literature.

Biography
Hua was born and raised in Qingyuan Manchu Autonomous County, Liaoning.

On November 21, 2014, Hua Qianfang took part in China's inaugural World Internet Conference, he said: "In its determination to lead the Information Age, China already has the heart of Sima Zhao."

Works
 Our Armageddon
 Our Journey Is The Ocean of Stars

References

External links

1978 births
Writers from Liaoning
Living people